This is a list of the main career statistics of professional Canadian tennis player Vasek Pospisil.

Performance timelines

Singles
Current through the 2022 Miami Open.

Notes

Doubles

Grand Slam finals

Doubles: 1 (1 title)

Other significant finals

Masters 1000 finals

Doubles: 6 (1 title, 5 runners-up)

Olympic medal matches

Doubles: 1 (4th place)

ATP career finals

Singles: 3 (3 runners-ups)

Doubles: 15 (7 titles, 8 runners-up)

Other finals

Team competitions: 2 (1 win, 1 runner-up)

Challenger and Futures finals

Singles: 30 (21 titles, 9 runner-ups)

Doubles: 31 (17 titles, 14 runner–ups)

Junior Grand Slam finals

Doubles: 2 (2 runners-up)

Record against other players

Record against top 10 players 
Pospisil's match record against those who have been ranked in the top 10, with those who have been No. 1 in bold (ATP World Tour, Grand Slam and Davis Cup main draw matches).

  Richard Gasquet 4–2
  Fabio Fognini 2–0
  Diego Schwartzman 2–0
  Tomáš Berdych 2–1
  Radek Štěpánek 2–1
  Milos Raonic 2–2
  John Isner 2–5
  Nikolay Davydenko 1–0
  Juan Martín del Potro 1–0
  Karen Khachanov 1–0
  Jürgen Melzer 1–0
  Lucas Pouille 1–0
  Hubert Hurkacz 1–0
  David Goffin 1–1
  Lleyton Hewitt 1–1
  Andrey Rublev 1–2
  Roberto Bautista Agut 1–3
  Grigor Dimitrov 1–3
  Daniil Medvedev 1–3
  Denis Shapovalov 1–3
  Gilles Simon 1–3
  Marcos Baghdatis 1–4
  Andy Murray 1–5
  Matteo Berrettini 0–1
  David Nalbandian 0–1
  Kei Nishikori 0–1
  Tommy Robredo 0–1
  Janko Tipsarević 0–1
  Stefanos Tsitsipas 0–1
  Jo Wilfried Tsonga 0–1
  Stan Wawrinka 0–1
  Alexander Zverev 0–1
  Kevin Anderson 0–2
  Rafael Nadal 0–2
  Jack Sock 0–2
  Dominic Thiem 0–2
  Fernando Verdasco 0–2
  Mikhail Youzhny 0–2
  Marin Čilić 0–3
  Roger Federer 0–3
  David Ferrer 0–3
  Juan Mónaco 0–3
  Novak Djokovic 0–5
  Gaël Monfils 0–6

*

Wins over top-10 opponents
Pospisil has a  record against players who were, at the time the match was played, ranked in the top 10.

Coaches

References

Pospisil, Vasek